Three motions of no confidence in the French government of Élisabeth Borne were tabled by the left-wing NUPES coalition and the far-right National Rally on 24 October 2022.

Marine Le Pen, who leads the parliamentary group of the National Rally, surprisingly announced at the last minute that her party would vote in favour of any motion of no confidence tabled by the other parliamentary groups ″in acceptable terms″. Despite the votes of the National Rally in favour of a motion tabled by the NUPES coalition, it remained 50 votes short of a majority, due to the refusal of the right-wing Republicans to support it. The LR group justified its refusal to vote the motion of no confidence ″out of responsibility″ in order to avoid ″chaos″.

The three motions were rejected.

Background

Previous motion of no-confidence 

The NUPES coalition, which endorsed left wing populist Jean-Luc Mélénchon for Prime Minister has decided to be firmly in opposition to Emmanuel Macron by tabling a motion of censure against the Borne government as soon as possible after the 2022 legislative elections.

Use of article 49.3 by the government 
The Borne government, a few days earlier, used the "Article 49.3" of the Constitution, which allows the government to impose the adoption of a text by the Assembly, immediately and without a vote. The opposition parties then reacted by tabling motions of no confidence.

Results

Motion of no confidence by NUPES

Motion of no confidence by RN

Second motion of no confidence by NUPES

See also 

 July 2022 vote of no confidence in the government of Élisabeth Borne

References 

2022 in Paris
2022 in French politics
October 2022 events in France
Votes of no confidence in France
Emmanuel Macron